is an agreement that the Nippon Professional Baseball Organization stipulates all NPB regulations, such as player contracts, draft and commissioner authority.

Summary
Nippon Professional Baseball Agreement came into effect on June 21,  and is being revised from time to time.

This Agreement consists of this article and the unified contract document format used by all players when making a contract.

All regulations such as draft meetings, player contracts, commissioner authority, etc. are stipulated, and NPB is operated based on this agreement, which is also called the "Constitution of Nippon Professional Baseball".

As the rules attached to this agreement, the rules of the Developmental player system (日本プロ野球育成選手に関する規約) and the rules of the operation of the Nippon Professional Baseball draft (新人選手選択会議規約) and the rules of the free agent system. (フリーエージェント規約) etc. are stipulated.

Composition

 Chapter 1: General rules
 Chapter 2: Commissioner
 Chapter 3: Executive Committee
 Chapter 4: Owners' Meeting
 Chapter 5: Commissioner Secretariat
 Chapter 6: Qualification to participate
 Chapter 7: Region protection rights
 Chapter 8: Player contract
 Chapter 9: Hold players
 Chapter 10: Reinstatement procedure
 Chapter 11: Limitation on the number of players
 Chapter 12: Salary limits
 Chapter 13: Transfer of player contract
 Chapter 14: Draft meeting
 Chapter 15: Adoption of rookie player
 Chapter 16: Umpire and scorer
 Chapter 17: Game
 Chapter 18: Harmful behavior
 Chapter 19: Prohibition of interests
 Chapter 20: Sue
 Chapter 21: Note
 Chapter 22: Free agent
 Chapter 23: Special case of structural reform
 Chapter 24: Japan Series participation team decision match

See also
 Nippon Professional Baseball
 Nippon Professional Baseball rosters
 Registration of players under control
 Developmental player system

References

External links
 野球協約・統一契約書 - Japan Professional Baseball Players Association Official site 

Nippon Professional Baseball